Up Denali 3D is a stereoscopic (3D) documentary directed and produced by Thomas Riederer PE. The film portrays an epic adventure trek and technical summit climb of the highest mountain in North America. The mountain is also known as Mount McKinley. Denali has an altitude of 20,320 and is one of the Seven Summits of the World. Situated in Alaska, in Denali National Park and Preserve near the Arctic Circle, a June Denali climb is spent entirely without darkness – essentially a single month-long “day”.  And being so far North and so high, the entire climb, from flying into Base Camp via bush plane, to up-and-down the Kahiltna Glacier with repetitive carry-and-move snowshoe pack trips, to steep ascents near the 20,000’ Summit Ridge is spent entirely on snow.

This is a classic climb of America’s highest-altitude jewel. Start in the lush, green Talkeetna summer and wind your way through spectacular 3D vistas, blizzards and personal triumphs to reach the pinnacle of the United States of America.  Once you see the mountains in 3D you’ll never want to see them “flat” again!

Origins 
Up Denali 3D is the fifth 3D mountaineering movie from tree-D Films in the series of Seven Summits in Three Dimensions. Previous 3D films were shot on Cerro Aconcagua, (Aconcagua - The Top of the Western World), Mount Kilimanjaro, (Africa 3D), Russia's Mount Elbrus, (unedited), and Carstensz Pyramid, aka Puncak Jaya, (Carstensz Pyramid – 3D Adventure in Irian Jaya).

Cast

Climbers
The climbers were individuals who had never met each other and came from a variety of backgrounds. Tom Riederer was on the path of the Seven Summits - this would be his fifth, all filmed in 3D. Mike Smith was an athletic mechanic working for Delta Airlines in Atlanta GA. Gary D. Bacon is a former business executive-turned-adventure-traveler and mountaineer. Steve Ullman was only 18 years old at the time of the climb, and had participated in Outward Bound mountaineering school.  His grandparents in Massachusetts coincidentally lived next door to Bradford Washburn. Phil Fleet was attempting to join the High Pointers club, summiting the highest point in each of the 50 US states.  Denali was his 48th, and most difficult.

Guides
Guide Kirby Spangler is from Alaska and has many years climbing experience. Rob Gowler is from Jackson WY and has guided around the world.  Both men were affiliated with the Alaska Mountaineering School/Alaska-Denali Guides and highly skilled for the climb.

Physical Training and Preparation 
Climbing a big mountain obviously requires one to be fit and strong. Filming at the same time furthers this requirement. Training is started months in advance.

Preparation of equipment, aside from the camera equipment, is a significant undertaking for each member of the team.  A typical gear list has numerous items for climbing and camping in cold and windy weather.  Similar attention for food preparation is required as well, since catering does not deliver to 20,000ft!

Production

Camera development for extreme environments 
Thomas Riederer is a Professional Engineer and inventor who developed the camera system used in the filming of Up Denali 3D, which needed to be reliable for the extreme cold weather anticipated by the climb, as well as light, self-contained and portable to allow a month's worth of shooting with no resupply.  Advancements from the camera system used for Aconcagua were designed and tested prior to production.  A digital video camera with a modification of the NuView 3D lens, which Riederer invented, was selected. Modifications included a heating system to keep the camera operational at filming temperatures down to 35 below zero Fahrenheit, Left eye/Right eye polarization balancing for taming the white glare of the snow, vertical alignment mechanisms to avoid Left eye/Right eye vertical parallax and other optical, electronic and mechanical modifications.

Further camera development 
Based on the filming success of Up Denali 3D and with the subsequent advent of high-definition television, Thomas Riederer developed and patented advanced stereoscopic cameras for observation, entertainment, virtual reality and surgical applications.

On the 3D display side, the advent and development of 3D image processing software such as Stereoscopic Player and StereoMovieMaker have enabled standard-definition productions like Up Denali 3D to be displayed in higher resolution on 3DHD flat-panel televisions.

Filming 
The film was shot entirely on location, in Denali National Park and in and around Talkeetna, Alaska.  Due to extreme crevasse danger on the glacier the climbers/guides were always roped together in teams of three or four during travel.  Higher up the mountain, the steepness and sheer exposure also required roping-up of not only the climbers to each other but also to the mountain.  That required snow protection in the form of snow pickets such that the ropes, and hence climbers, were tied to the mountain to prevent catastrophe should a climber fall.  This aspect, though adding to filming difficulty, also gave the production an "up close and personal" feel.  Some of the scenes showed the ropes, adding an interesting additional 3D depth cue

To save weight and space in the otherwise 75 lb pack, no tripod was used in the filming, as Thomas Riederer was formerly a competitive pistol shooter with quite steady hands for steady shots.

Route 
The chosen route was the now-ubiquitous West Buttress route first pioneered by Bradford Washburn in 1951. The route is detailed in a book by Colby Coombs and Bradford Washburn

Release
Due to the lack of suitable 3D display systems in theaters at the time, Up Denali 3D was initially released to local Santa Barbara venues on an informal basis.  Portable 3D projection systems were set up by Riederer, and the film was played along with sister tree-D Films productions.

Up Denali 3D was released to a more broad audience in 2004, where it was played with excellent acceptance at the Santa Cruz Film Festival.  In 2005, the film was presented at the Marjorie Luke Theater. as part of the Digital Days Film Festival Digital Days is an offshoot of the Santa Barbara International Film Festival, where in February 2004 Riederer's Aconcagua – The Top of the Western World was the first 3D film ever to be played there.

Subsequent screenings were held at the National Stereoscopic Association annual convention in Irving, Texas, in July 2005, Stereoscopic Displays and Applications convention in 2006, West (Sonoma CA) County Film Fest in October 2008, Paso Robles Indie 3D Film Festival in November 2008, and numerous other venues in subsequent years.

Distribution
In 2006, Up Denali 3D was released on DVD in both 2D and Field-Sequential 3D (Active shutter 3D system) formats.  The DVD is available through several 3D DVD distributors.  In addition, the film is available from 3D content streaming sites.  A Blu-ray Disc version is planned, for better compatibility with 3D HDTV systems.  Distribution was made to several overseas distributors as well.

Accolades
The Stereo Club of Southern California awarded Up Denali 3D, as well as a sister previous production Alaska 3D: Flora, Fauna & Fishin’ both Honorable Mention medals at its 2005 "The 4th Ever 3D Movie/Video Competition" on July 21, 2005.  The judges were Ray Zone, Chris Condon and Dan Symmes, all legendary stalwarts in the stereoscopic film business.  Thomas Riederer was present at the awards, and knew the judges well.

References

3D short films
American documentary films
2003 documentary films
2003 films
2003 3D films
3D documentary films
2000s English-language films
2000s American films
Films shot in Alaska
Films set in Alaska